Krastava is a village located in Velingrad Municipality, Pazardzhik Province, Southern Bulgaria.

The village of Krastava is located in a mountainous area, 26 km from Velingrad. It is a mountainous area composed mainly of pine and spruce forests. From the vicinity of the village three mountains can be seen - Rila, Pirin, Rhodope Mountains, as well as the peaks Musala, Vihren, Golyama Syutka and Malka Syutka.

History 
Krastava was established as a settlement in 1790. The first school was established in 1926. As a village, it was established on 24 October 1975. In 1978, the mahallas Goritsa (Asanova) and Krantiyte were incorporated into Krastava and had its own mayoralty in 1979.

Religion 
Krastava is a Pomak village.

References 

Villages in Pazardzhik Province